"Desert" is a song by Australian record producer Paces featuring  Australian recording artist Guy Sebastian. The song was  released in August 2016 as the fourth single from Paces debut studio album, Vacation (2016).

Background and release
Sebastian said he'd been a fan of Paces “for a while” and contacted him in 2015 to write together. Paces remixed Sebastian's 2015 single "Black & Blue" which was released in January 2016. Paces sent Sebastian "Desert" on which he recorded his vocals.

In February 2016 Paces announced the track list for his debut studio album, which was released in March 2016, and it included Guy Sebastian on "Desert".

On 20 May 2016, Paces and Sebastian performed LDRU's "Keeping Score" on Triple J's Like a Version to critical acclaim. It was Sebastian’s debut on Triple J.

In July 2016, Sebastian performed with Paces at Splendour in the Grass. Sebastian said "I was scared, I've gotta be honest. I think I go there feeling like I'm gonna be judged so I get nervous and I'm a bit self-doubting…" adding once he was on stage "everyone in the crowd starting cheering and stuff and it almost gave me this sense of relief." This performance was met with acclaim and the performance became the film clip and the single was released a few weeks later.

Music video
The music video for "Desert" premiered on YouTube on 14 August 2016. It was filmed and edited by Patrick Rohl and Sam Bratby and recorded at Splendour in the Grass in July 2016.

Reception
In an album review, AAA Backstage said “"Desert" begins with beautiful key chords and Sebastian's soulful voice. Paces, being the clever electronic music man he is, altered Sebastian's voice into dark strawberry jam richness impossible to ignore.”

Track listing

Charts

References

2016 singles
2016 songs
Guy Sebastian songs
Songs written by Alexander Burnett (musician)